William Gibson (born 1948) is an American-Canadian science fiction author.

William Gibson may also refer to:

Sports
Will Gibson (1869–1911), Scottish footballer with Sunderland
Billy Gibson (boxing) (1876–1947), boxing promoter and manager
William Gibson (footballer, born 1876) (1876–?), Irish footballer who played for Sunderland AFC
William Gibson (1920s footballer), Scottish football player
William Gibson (footballer, born 1926) (1926–1995), Scottish footballer who played for Tranmere Rovers
William Gibson (ice hockey) (1927–2006), Canadian hockey player
Bill Gibson (basketball) (c. 1928–1975), American basketball coach
Willie Gibson (footballer, born 1898) (1898–1992), Scottish footballer who played for Newcastle United
Willie Gibson (footballer, born 1953), Scottish footballer for Hearts, Partick Thistle, Raith Rovers and Cowdenbeath
Billy Gibson (footballer, born 1981), Scottish footballer who played for Partick Thistle
Willie Gibson (footballer, born 1984), Scottish footballer who is currently player-manager for Queen of the South
Billy Gibson (footballer, born 1990), English footballer who played for Yeovil Town

Politicians
William Gibson-Craig (1797–1878), Scottish advocate and politician
William Gibson (Canadian Independent Liberal politician) (1815–1890), Canadian Independent Liberal Member of Parliament
William Harvey Gibson (1821–1894), Republican politician and American Union Army general
William J. Gibson (died 1863), Wisconsin state senator who died in the Civil War
W. C. Gibson (William Charles Gibson), Accountant General and Controller of Revenue of Ceylon, 1851–1861
William Gibson (Liberal Party of Canada politician) (1849–1914), Canadian Member of Parliament and Senator
William Gibson (Ulster Unionist Party politician) (1859/60–?), Member of the Senate of Northern Ireland
William Gibson, 2nd Baron Ashbourne (1868–1942), Anglo-Irish Member of Parliament
William Gibson (Australian politician) (1869–1955), Australian politician
William Kennedy Gibson (1876–1949), Irish footballer and politician

Religion 
William Gibson (martyr) (1548–1596), English Catholic martyr
William Gibson (priest) (1717–1754), Canon of Windsor and Archdeacon of Essex
William Gibson (bishop) (1738–1821), Vicar Apostolic of the Northern District of England
William Gibson (minister) (1806–1867), Irish presbyterian minister
William Gibson Sloan (1838–1914), Plymouth Brethren evangelist
William Moroni Gibson (1847–1917), Mormon pioneer
William Gibson (Dean of Ferns), Dean of Ferns from 1932 to 1936

Arts and entertainment 
William Hamilton Gibson (1850–1896), American illustrator, author and naturalist
William Gibson (producer) (1869–1929), Australian film producer and exhibitor
William Gibson (playwright) (1914–2008), American playwright, author of The Miracle Worker
Bill Gibson (drummer) (born 1951), drummer for Huey Lewis and the News
Bill Gibson (music producer) (born 1955), American music producer

Other
William Gibson (painter) (1644–1702), English miniature painter
William Gibson (anatomist) (died 1753), professor of Anatomy at Cambridge University
William Sidney Gibson (1814–1871), English barrister and antiquarian
William H. Gibson (educator) (1829–1906), American educator and civil rights activist
William Pettigrew Gibson (1902–1960), Scottish art historian, Wallace Collection, Courtauld Institute of Art, National Gallery
William Willard Gibson Jr. (born 1932), lawyer in Texas
William Gibson (NAACP activist) (1933–2002), American dentist and chairman of NAACP
William Clyde Gibson (born 1957), American convicted serial killer
William Gibson (historian) (born 1959), British historian, academic, writer, and professor